The R League, also known as the Korean Professional Football Reserve League, is the league for reserve teams of professional football clubs in South Korea. It was started in 1990 with reserve teams of five K League clubs. 

The R League was not held for nine years after the inaugural season, but was relaunched in a new format in 2000. The participating teams were split into two regional leagues, and high ranking teams of each league qualified for the playoffs to decide overall champions. It was originally named reserve league, but was renamed the R League in 2009.

The R League was abolished in 2013 due to the foundation of the K League 2, which needed participating players, but was restarted in 2016. It was once again cancelled in 2020 and 2021 due to the COVID-19 pandemic. On the one hand, the Korea Football Association (KFA) allowed reserve teams to join the K4 League in 2021, and so they could enter South Korean football league system.

Korean Police participated in the R League until 2012, although it was not a reserve team of a K League club.

Champions

List of champions

Titles by club 
K League's principle of official statistics is that final club succeeds to predecessor club's history & records.

Awards

Most Valuable Player

Top goalscorer

Top assist provider

See also
 K League
 U-League

References

External links
Results (2000–2002) at Soccer World 

 
South Korea